Vivada Inland Waterways Limited is the largest inland waterways company in India.  It was established in 1966 as Bunkerers to oceangoing vessels, Vivada offers a wide variety of Waterways services.  Vivada has a fleet of 12 Vessels of various types and capacities ranging from 75mt to 2,200mt.

Offered services
Transportation of Bulk POL and Dry Cargo in National Waterways, including the longest route of Kolkata to Assam through the waterways of Bangladesh.

Providing Bunker services to vessels calling at Port of Kolkata and Haldia.
Providing Logistic solutions for Mega Projects for carriage of Over Dimensional Cargo (cargo that extends beyond the loading deck of the vehicle transporting the cargo) logistics.
Operating Floating Retail Diesel Outlets
Operating Vehicular Ferry services
Operating River Cruising with facilities for conferences, parties and receptions.

Ecotourism
Vivada entered into tourism by launching first ever ecotourism project to Sunderbans by launching cruiser vessel M.V. Paramhamsa with state-of-the-art facilities.  This will promote tourism to the Sundebans throughout the year and will promote the culture and local artisans in the process, giving them a much needed boost. 

Vivada's luxury day cruiser, M.V. Ahalya, which cruises on the Ganges, has for the last several years, proved to be the most popular cruise vessel for short cruises. 

Vivada also offers services such as water taxis, encouraging people to take a riverine route.

References
Sunderban cruises website
Official website of Vivada Inland Waterways

Water transport in India
Companies based in Kolkata
Transport companies of India
Freight transport companies
Indian companies established in 1966
1966 establishments in West Bengal